The 1980 Australia rugby union tour of Fiji was a series of 3 matches played in May 1980 by Australia in Fiji.

Results 

Scores and results list Australia's points tally first.

Sources
 Howell, Max (2005) Born to Lead – Wallaby Test Captains, Celebrity Books, Auckland NZ

Australia
Australia national rugby union team tours
Rugby union tours of Fiji
tour
tour